Matthew Chou Bowman (born May 31, 1991) is an American professional baseball pitcher in the New York Yankees organization.  He previously played in Major League Baseball (MLB) for the St. Louis Cardinals and Cincinnati Reds.

High school and college

Bowman attended St. Albans School in Washington, D.C. As a senior he was All-Met Player of the Year and All-Conference as a shortstop and right-handed pitcher, and had a 0.70 ERA as a pitcher and a .419 average as a batter.

He played college baseball for the Princeton Tigers at Princeton University from 2010 to 2012. He was both a pitcher and shortstop for the Tigers.  He had a low-90s fastball that ran as high as 95 mph, a hard slider, a curveball, and a changeup. He was second-team all-Ivy League at shortstop as a sophomore.  In 2012, as a junior, he went 4–2 with a 4.66 ERA in nine starts along with batting .308 with one home run in 33 games. During the summers in college, he pitched for the Bethesda Big Train.

Professional career

New York Mets
The New York Mets selected Bowman in the 13th round of the 2012 Major League Baseball draft. He made his professional debut that season for the Brooklyn Cyclones. He had a 2.45 earned run average (ERA) in  innings pitched. Bowman started 2013 with the Savannah Sand Gnats and was promoted to the St. Lucie Mets during the season. Over 21 starts he had a 10–4 win–loss record with a 3.05 ERA and 116 strikeouts.

Bowman started the 2014 season with the Binghamton Mets and was promoted to the Las Vegas 51s in July; in 24 games (23 starts) between the two teams, he was 10–8 with a 3.21 ERA. He spent the 2015 season back with Las Vegas, where he pitched to a 7–16 record and 5.53 ERA.

St. Louis Cardinals
The St. Louis Cardinals selected Bowman in the 2015 Rule 5 draft. He made his MLB debut against the Pittsburgh Pirates on April 6, 2016, throwing two innings with one hit allowed and two strikeouts. He earned his first MLB win on June 8, 2016, in relief against the Cincinnati Reds. Bowman finished his first MLB season with a 2–5 win–loss record along with a 3.46 ERA. In 2017, he was 3–6 with two saves and a 3.99 ERA in  innings pitched in relief.

Bowman began 2018 back in St. Louis' bullpen. However, after compiling a 5.75 ERA in  innings pitched with two stints on the disabled list, he was optioned to the Triple-A Memphis Redbirds on July 5. He was recalled by St. Louis on July 18 and optioned back to Memphis on July 21, and spent the remainder of the season there. In 22 relief appearances for the Cardinals he was 0–2 with a 6.26 ERA, and in 18 relief appearances for Memphis, he compiled a 0–1 record with a 4.30 ERA.

Cincinnati Reds
On November 2, 2018, Bowman was claimed off waivers by the Cincinnati Reds. He began the 2019 season with the Louisville Bats, and was promoted to the Reds in May. Bowman underwent Tommy John surgery in mid-September 2020. On October 14, 2020, Bowman was outrighted off of the roster. Bowman elected free agency two days later on October 16.

New York Yankees
On December 14, 2020, Bowman signed a two-year minor league contract with the New York Yankees organization. Bowman did not pitch in 2021 as he recovered from surgery, and ended up missing the entire 2022 season as well. He elected free agency on November 10, 2022.

On January 13, 2023, Bowman re-signed with the Yankees organization on a minor league contract.

See also

 St. Louis Cardinals all-time roster
 Cincinnati Reds all-time roster
 Rule 5 draft results

References

External links

1991 births
Living people
People from Chevy Chase, Maryland
Baseball players from Maryland
Major League Baseball pitchers
St. Louis Cardinals players
Cincinnati Reds players
Princeton Tigers baseball players
Brooklyn Cyclones players
Savannah Sand Gnats players
St. Lucie Mets players
Binghamton Mets players
Las Vegas 51s players
St. Albans School (Washington, D.C.) alumni
Memphis Redbirds players
Louisville Bats players